Paula Saldanha (born 6 March 1972) is a Portuguese judoka. She competed in the women's half-lightweight event at the 1992 Summer Olympics.

References

External links
 

1972 births
Living people
Portuguese female judoka
Olympic judoka of Portugal
Judoka at the 1992 Summer Olympics
Sportspeople from Funchal